Terthreutis xanthocycla is a species of moth of the  family Tortricidae. It is found in Yunnan, China.

The wingspan is about 18 mm. The ground colour of the forewings is cream, tinged with brownish in the costal and terminal parts, with brownish strigulation (fine streaks). The hindwings are whitish.

References

Moths described in 1938
Archipini